The Cổ Chiên River is a river of Vietnam. It flows for 82 kilometres through Bến Tre Province, Trà Vinh Province and Vĩnh Long Province.

References

Rivers of Bến Tre province
Rivers of Trà Vinh province
Rivers of Vĩnh Long province
Rivers of Vietnam